Hypsoblennius sordidus is a species of combtooth blenny found in the south-eastern Pacific Ocean, from Lima, Peru south to Chile.  This species grows to a length of  TL.

References

sordidus
Fish described in 1828